Roland Ratzenberger (4 July 1960 – 30 April 1994) was an Austrian racing driver who raced in various categories of motorsport, including British Formula 3000, Japanese Formula 3000 and Formula One. He was killed in a crash during qualifying for the 1994 San Marino Grand Prix just three races into his F1 career. The weekend would become notorious for also seeing the death of Ayrton Senna, a three time world champion, during the race the following day.

The Grand Prix Drivers' Association was reformed as a direct result of Ratzenberger's death, while the weekend as a whole led to a markedly increased emphasis on safety in the sport.

Early and personal life 
Ratzenberger was born in Salzburg, Austria, on 4 July 1960. When he was seven, his grandmother took him to a local hillclimb race at Gaisberg. Ιn 1969, the Salzburgring opened near his home. As a  teenager, he discovered that racer and Formula Ford team owner Walter Lechner was based nearby and, while studying at a technical school, began to hang around the workshop. On finishing his education at eighteen, he joined Lechner, who was at this time opening a racing school at the Salzburgring.

In the winter of 1991, in Monaco, and after what Adam Cooper described as "a whirlwind courtship," Ratzenberger married the former partner of another driver, becoming stepfather to her son from a previous relationship. They were divorced around the start of the 1992 season.

Career 
Ratzenberger began racing in German Formula Ford in 1983, and in 1985 won both the Austrian and Central European Formula Ford championships. In 1985, he entered the Formula Ford Festival at Brands Hatch in England, finishing second. He returned in 1986 to win the event, before graduating to British Formula 3 the following season. While in the UK, he briefly gained fame for the similarity of his name to that of TV puppet Roland Rat, with whom he appeared in an edition of TV-am; the TV-am branding appeared for a time  on his car.

Two years in British F3 yielded two 12th places in the championship with West Surrey Racing and Madgwick Motorsport. He also raced in other cars besides single seaters, once finishing second in the 1987 World Touring Car Championship driving a Team Schnitzer BMW M3. In 1988, he entered the final few rounds of the British Touring Car Championship in a class B BMW M3, racing for the Demon Tweeks team. The next year, he entered the British Formula 3000 series, finishing third overall, and also raced in the Le Mans 24 Hours for the first time; the Brun Motorsport, Porsche 962 he shared with Maurizio Sandro Sala and Walter Lechner retired in the third hour. He would take part in the next four Le Mans races, with Brun again in 1991, and with the SARD team in 1990, 1992 and 1993.

In the 1990s, Ratzenberger began racing primarily in Japan. He won one race each in 1990 and 1991 in the Japanese Sports Prototype Championship with the same SARD team he drove for at Le Mans. He also returned to touring car racing in the Japanese Touring Car Championship, finishing seventh in 1990 and 1991 in a BMW M3. During the latter year, Ratzenberger tested a CART Lola T91/00 for Dick Simon Racing at Willow Springs.

This paved the way for a return to Formula 3000 in the Japanese championship, with the Stellar team in the 1992 season. His year began poorly but, when the team upgraded their two-year-old Lola for a new model, Ratzenberger won once to finish seventh overall. He remained in the series in 1993, finishing 11th. That year, he achieved his highest finish at Le Mans, as he, Mauro Martini, and Naoki Nagasaka finished fifth in a Toyota 93 C-V.

Formula One 

Ratzenberger greatly desired to race in Formula One, especially as former rivals in F3000, such as Eddie Irvine and Johnny Herbert, managed to reach the top level while he did not. He came very close to securing a drive with the Jordan team for their inaugural season in 1991. Negotiations were at a very advanced stage when Ratzenberger lost the financial support of a "major sponsor." In the end, Bertrand Gachot secured the drive.

In 1994, he achieved his ambition of becoming a Formula One driver. After gaining a sponsor in a wealthy German woman, who negotiated a deal over the 1993-4 winter, Ratzenberger signed a five-race deal with the new Simtek team, partnering David Brabham. With a very uncompetitive car, Ratzenberger failed to qualify for the first race at Interlagos. However, the next round at the TI Circuit in Aida went much better, as he not only managed to qualify, but finish in a very commendable eleventh place, even considering that he was the only driver who had raced at the venue before.

Death

Crash
The San Marino Grand Prix at Imola would have been Ratzenberger's third race in Formula One. During the first qualifying session on Friday 29 April, he asked the more experienced Brabham to test his car out; the Australian vindicated Ratzenberger's assessment of the brakes, which had been troubling him at the previous races. According to Brabham, the issue was soon resolved to the satisfaction of both. Having received injuries to his nose and arm, Barrichello was transferred to a nearby hospital, and took no further part in the weekend.

The next day, the second qualifying session proceeded as normal until the moment of his accident. Early in the session, Ratzenberger went off the track at the Acqua Minerale chicane. With his sponsor in attendance for the first time, and at the halfway point of his contract, he decided to carry on, after checking the car to the best of his abilities.

Ratzenberger's crash was measured at about 500g, the highest g force for a crash in Formula 1.

Ratzenberger was transferred by ambulance to Imola Circuit's medical centre, then by air ambulance to the Maggiore Hospital in Bologna where he was pronounced dead upon arrival. He had suffered three individually fatal injuries: a basilar skull fracture, which was named as the official cause of death; blunt trauma from the front-left tyre penetrating the survival cell; and a ruptured aorta. Ratzenberger was the first racing driver to lose his life at a grand prix weekend since the 1982 season, when Riccardo Paletti was killed at the Canadian Grand Prix at the Circuit Gilles Villeneuve. Ratzenberger was also the first driver to die as a result of a crash in an F1 car since Elio de Angelis during testing for the 1986 Formula One season.

Bernie Ecclestone personally delivered the confirmation of Ratzenberger's death to the stunned Simtek team. Grieving, Brabham made the decision to compete on Sunday:

Ayrton Senna commandeered an official car to hurry to the medical center; he learnt of Ratzenberger's death from friend and neurosurgeon Sid Watkins. Watkins suggested to the inconsolable Senna that he withdraw from the following day's race and go fishing instead, and asked him if he wanted to stop racing. Senna famously responded "I cannot quit, I have to go on," and, having returned to his garage, decided to withdraw for the remainder of qualifying.

Ratzenberger's spot on the starting grid was left empty. Paul Belmondo was reported to have been offered the final position on the grid but declined, out of respect for Ratzenberger and on the grounds that he had not earned that race spot.

Race and aftermath
When track officials examined the wreckage of Senna's racing car, they found a furled Austrian flag. Senna had planned to raise it after the race, in honour of Ratzenberger. The race was won by Michael Schumacher, with Nicola Larini and Mika Häkkinen in second and third positions respectively, while Brabham retired after 27 laps. Out of respect for Ratzenberger and Senna, no champagne was sprayed at the podium ceremony.

The death of Senna, a three-time world champion, mostly overshadowed Ratzenberger's: while all active Formula One drivers attended Senna's funeral, only five (Brabham, Herbert, Heinz-Harald Frentzen, and Ratzenberger's compatriots Karl Wendlinger and Gerhard Berger) attended Ratzenberger's. FIA president Max Mosley was also in attendance, noting in an interview ten years later:

Ratzenberger was buried in Maxglan, in Salzburg. Due to drive later that year in the Le Mans 24 Hours for Toyota, Ratzenberger's name was left on the car as a tribute, with his friend Eddie Irvine taking his place at the wheel.

Legacy
During the customary pre-race drivers' briefing on 1 May 1994, the remaining drivers agreed to the reformation of the Grand Prix Drivers' Association, with Senna, Berger and Schumacher intended to be its first directors.

Racing record

Complete British Touring Car Championship results 
(key) (Races in bold indicate pole position – 1982–1990 in class) (Races in italics indicate fastest lap – 1 point awarded ?–1989 in class)

24 Hours of Le Mans results

Complete Japanese Formula 3000 results 
(key) (Races in bold indicate pole position; races in italics indicate fastest lap)

† Did not finish, but was classified as he had completed more than 90% of the race distance.

Complete Formula One results 
(key)

References

External links 

Roland Ratzenberger  – memorial website 
F1 Rejects – a further tribute to Ratzenberger
F1 Fanatic Who's Who: Roland Ratzenberger
Roland Ratzenberger's fatal crash

1960 births
1994 deaths
Sportspeople from Salzburg
Austrian racing drivers
Austrian Formula One drivers
Simtek Formula One drivers
Japanese Formula 3000 Championship drivers
British Formula 3000 Championship drivers
World Touring Car Championship drivers
British Touring Car Championship drivers
Deutsche Tourenwagen Masters drivers
Japanese Touring Car Championship drivers
24 Hours of Le Mans drivers
Racing drivers who died while racing
Filmed deaths in motorsport
Sport deaths in Italy
Formula Ford drivers
World Sportscar Championship drivers
24 Hours of Spa drivers
Long Distance Series drivers
TOM'S drivers
Schnitzer Motorsport drivers